The Hull–Wolcott House is an historic building in Maumee, Ohio.

Named for James Wolcott, a businessman in the late 1820s to the mid-1840s, only the Wolcott House is original to the site. Built by James Wolcott and his wife, Mary Wells, the Wolcott House began as a log house and evolved into a 14-room Federal-style mansion between 1827 and 1836.  The house is a blend of federal and classic architecture.

In 1826,  James Wolcott and his Mary moved to Maumee. They purchased 300 acres for $1.25 an acre in 1827 and began construction of their home.  Wolcott built wharves and warehouses on the Maumee River and  constructed two steamships to transport his merchandise. .

James and Mary Wolcott had five sons and a daughter. The house passed through three generations to Wolcott's great-granddaughter, Rilla Hull, who was the last of the Wolcott line to reside in the "Mansion on the Maumee".  Upon her death in 1957,  Hull bequeathed her home for public use and benefit. St. Paul's Episcopal Church transferred the landmark to the City of Maumee for use as a historical museum.

Home Ownership: James and Mary Wolcott – b.1789 to d.1873, Mary Ann Wolcott Gilbert – b.1827 to d.1891, Fredrica Gilbert Hull – b.1850 to d.1934, and Rilla E. Hull – b.1880 to d.1957.

Wolcott House Museum Complex 
Today the Hull–Wolcott House is part of the Wolcott House Museum Complex, which is  run by the Maumee Valley Historical Society. The complex consists of the following structures:

 The Wolcott House, ca. 1835* 
 The Log House, ca. 1850
 The Gilbert-Flanigan House, ca. 1841
 The Box Schoolhouse, ca. 1850
 The Clover Leaf Depot, ca. 1888
 The Monclova Country Church, ca. 1901

References

External links 

 Website of the Wolcott House Museum Complex
 "National Register Of Historic Places, Lucas County, OH"

Houses completed in 1836
Federal architecture in Ohio
Historic house museums in Ohio
Houses on the National Register of Historic Places in Ohio
Museums in Lucas County, Ohio
National Register of Historic Places in Lucas County, Ohio
Houses in Lucas County, Ohio